Protein MPV17 is a protein that in humans is encoded by the MPV17 gene. It is a mitochondrial inner membrane protein, which has a so far largely unknown role in mtDNA maintenance. Protein MPV17 is expressed in human pancreas, kidney, muscle, liver, lung, placenta, brain and heart. Human MPV17 is the orthologue of the mouse kidney disease gene, Mpv17. Loss of function has been shown to cause hepatocerebral mtDNA depletion syndromes (MDS) with oxidative phosphorylation failure and mtDNA depletion both in affected individuals and in Mpv17−/− mice.

Function 

This protein was first thought to be a peroxisomal protein, but in 2006, Spinazzola demonstrated that it is a mitochondrial inner membrane protein that is implicated in the formation of reactive oxygen species (ROS).

Restoration of Mpv17 expression in a Mpv17-/- mice restore mtDNA copy number, suggesting MPV17 is involved in mtDNA copy number, and in mtDNA maintenance.

MPV17 seems to be also involved in apoptosis in podocytes, and involved in ROS.

Structure

Gene 

The human MPV17 gene is located on chromosome 2 at p21-23, comprising eight exons encoding 176 amino acids.

Protein 

MPV17 belongs to a family of integral membrane proteins consisting of four members (PXMP2, MPV17, MP-L, and FKSG24 (MPV17L2)) in mammals and two members (Sym1 and Yor292) in yeast. The amino acid sequence of MPV17 (176 amino acids) contains four cysteine residues and three putative phosphorylation sites implies that this protein may act as a redox- and ATP-sensitive channel.

Clinical significance 

Mutations in this gene have been associated with the hepatocerebral form of mitochondrial DNA depletion syndrome (MDS), a mutation in this protein leads to an mtDNA (mitochondrial DNA) copy number decrease. By 2013, MDS caused by MPV17 mutations had been reported in 32 patients with the clinical manifestations including early progressive liver failure, neurological abnormalities, hypoglycaemia and raised blood lactate. In addition, MPV17 mutations have also been associated with autosomal recessive adult-onset neuropathy and leukoencephalopathy with multiple mtDNA deletions in skeletal muscle. Thus, MPV17 mutations can lead to recessive MDS or recessive multiple mtDNA deletion disorders.

Interactions 

MPV17 has been shown to interact with Prkdc protein during Adriamycin-induced nephropathy in mice.

References

Further reading